Nannostomus marilynae, (from the Greek: nanos = small, and the Latin stomus = relating to the mouth; marilynae = in honor of ichthyologist, Marilyn Weitzman),  commonly known as Marilyn's or greenstripe pencilfish, is a freshwater species of fish belonging to the characin family Lebiasinidae. They have been recorded from the Rio Negro and Rio Orinoco regions of Brazil, Venezuela, and Colombia.

References

Lebiasinidae
Taxa named by Stanley Howard Weitzman
Taxa named by John Stanley Cobb
Fish described in 1975
Fish of South America
Fish of the Amazon basin